Aaron Kent Broten (born November 14, 1960) is an American former professional ice hockey player. Drafted in the sixth round, 106th overall in the 1980 NHL Entry Draft by the Colorado Rockies, Broten went on to play 748 regular season games in the National Hockey League (NHL).

Career
Broten was born in Roseau, Minnesota. He is the brother of former NHL players Neal Broten and Paul Broten. Broten's nephew, Shane Gersich, was drafted by the Washington Capitals in the 2014 NHL Entry Draft.

During his twelve-year career, Broten played for six different NHL teams, including both parts of the Colorado Rockies/New Jersey Devils franchise, the Minnesota North Stars, the Quebec Nordiques, the Toronto Maple Leafs, and the Winnipeg Jets.

In international hockey, Broten played for the United States national team at the 1981, 1982, 1985, 1986 and 1987 Ice Hockey World Championships as well as the 1984 Canada Cup and 1987 Canada Cup tournaments. Broten retired from professional hockey in 1992, but briefly came out of retirement in 1999 to once again play for the US national team in the 1999 Ice Hockey World Championship qualifying tournament (the U.S. team featuring several NHL players had surprisingly finished among the bottom four in the previous 1998 world championship tournament) when no active NHL players were available.

Broten was chosen to be inducted into the United States Hockey Hall of Fame as part of the 2007 class.

Awards and honors

Career statistics

Regular season and playoffs

International

References

External links

1960 births
Living people
People from Roseau, Minnesota
American men's ice hockey forwards
Colorado Rockies (NHL) draft picks
Colorado Rockies (NHL) players
Fort Worth Texans players
Ice hockey players from Minnesota
Minnesota Golden Gophers men's ice hockey players
Minnesota North Stars players
Moncton Hawks players
New Jersey Devils players
Quebec Nordiques players
Toronto Maple Leafs players
United States Hockey Hall of Fame inductees
Wichita Wind players
Winnipeg Jets (1979–1996) players
AHCA Division I men's ice hockey All-Americans